The following is a list of notable deaths in November 2011.

Entries for each day are listed alphabetically by surname. A typical entry lists information in the following sequence:
 Name, age, country of citizenship at birth, subsequent country of citizenship (if applicable), reason for notability, cause of death (if known), and reference.

November 2011

1
Gumaa Al-Shawan, 74, Egyptian intelligence agent.
Cahit Aral, 84, Turkish engineer and politician, Minister of Industry and Commerce (1983–1987).
Fanny Edelman, 100, Argentine politician, President of the PCA.
Sam Fink, 95, American calligrapher.
Richard Gordon, 85, British horror film producer.
André Hodeir, 90, French author, jazz arranger and composer.
Christiane Legrand, 81, French jazz singer.
Sergio Montiel, 84, Argentine politician, Governor of Entre Ríos (1983–1987; 1999–2003).
Dorothy Howell Rodham, 92, American homemaker, mother of Hillary Clinton.
Eilaine Roth, 82, American baseball player (AAGPBL), complications from cancer.
Héctor Rueda Hernández, 90, Colombian Roman Catholic prelate, Archbishop of Medellín (1991–1997).
Seppo Sanaksenaho, 73, Finnish politician, Mayor of Vaasa (1997–2001).
Katherine Siva Saubel, 91, American Cahuilla tribal leader and activist, one of the last speakers of the Cahuilla language.
Robert A. Scalapino, 92, American political scientist.
Ricardo Watty Urquidi, 73, American-born Mexican Roman Catholic prelate, Bishop of Tepic (since 2008), pancreatic cancer.

2
Sydney Andrew, 85, English industrial chemical engineer.
Stan Bergstein, 87, American harness racing executive.
Sickan Carlsson, 96, Swedish actress and singer.
Rijk de Gooyer, 85, Dutch actor, pancreatic cancer.
Ilmar Kullam, 89, Estonian Olympic silver medal-winning (1952) basketball player.
Lou Maletta, 74, American media executive, founder of Gay Cable Network, liver cancer.
Eugene Maslov, 66, Russian billiards coach.
Yoko Matsuoka McClain, 87, Japanese-born American professor (University of Oregon), granddaughter of Natsume Sōseki, stroke.
Sid Melton, 94, American character actor (The Golden Girls, Green Acres, The Danny Thomas Show), pneumonia.
Papa Bue, 81, Danish trombonist and bandleader.
Antonio Molino Rojo, 85, Spanish film actor.
Nikolay Saksonov, 88, Russian world champion weightlifter, Olympic silver medalist (1952).
Leonard Stone, 87, American actor (Willy Wonka & the Chocolate Factory, Soylent Green, L.A. Law), cancer.
Lucy Tejada, 91, Colombian painter.

3
Matty Alou, 72, Dominican Republic-born American baseball player (Pittsburgh Pirates, San Francisco Giants, St. Louis Cardinals), diabetes.
Rosángela Balbó, 70,  Mexican-Italian born actress, lung cancer.
Tamás Eszes, 47, Hungarian politician and paramilitary leader, suicide.
Bob Forsch, 61, American baseball player (St. Louis Cardinals), aortic aneurysm.
H. G. Francis, 75, German science fiction author.
Guo Tao, 85, Chinese lieutenant general.
Peeter Kreitzberg, 62, Estonian politician, Minister of Culture and Education (1995).
Justo Oscar Laguna, 82, Argentinian Roman Catholic prelate, Bishop of Morón (1980–2004).
Ivar Nørgaard, 89, Danish politician, negotiated Denmark's entry to the European Community.
John R. Opel, 86, American computer businessman, president and CEO of IBM.
Morris Philipson, 85, American book publisher and novelist.
Sir Timothy Raison, 82, British politician, Member of Parliament for Aylesbury (1970–1992).
Bruno Rubeo, 65, Italian production designer (Platoon, Driving Miss Daisy, Born on the Fourth of July), pneumonia.
John Young, 80, Scottish politician, MSP for West of Scotland (1999–2003).

4
Alfonso Cano, 63, Colombian guerrilla leader (FARC), shot.
Emmanuel de Bethune, 82, Belgian politician, Mayor of Kortrijk (1987–1989, 1995–2000), after long illness.
Arnold Green, 91, Estonian politician, President of the Estonian Olympic Committee (1989–1997).
Annabelle Lyon, 95, American ballet dancer.
Cynthia Myers, 61, American model (Playboy) and actress (Beyond the Valley of the Dolls), lung cancer.
Norman Foster Ramsey, Jr., 96, American physicist, Nobel Laureate (1989).
Andy Rooney, 92, American journalist  (60 Minutes), surgical complications.
Theadora Van Runkle, 83, American costume designer (The Godfather Part II, Bonnie and Clyde, Bullitt), lung cancer.
Sarah Watt, 53, Australian film director, bone and breast cancer.
Tadeusz Walasek, 75, Polish Olympic silver (1960) and bronze (1964) medal-winning boxer.
Dieudonné Yougbaré, 94, Burkinabé Roman Catholic prelate, Bishop of Koupéla (1956–1995).

5
Mario Roberto Álvarez, 97, Argentine architect.
George Ansbro, 96, American radio announcer.
Luigi Belloli, 88, Italian Roman Catholic prelate, Bishop of the Anagni-Alatri (1987–1999).
Franco Chillemi, 69, Italian actor and voice actor.
Les Daniels, 68, American writer.
Norton Dodge, 84, American economist and art collector.
Loulou de la Falaise, 63, French fashion muse and designer (Yves Saint Laurent).
Hannu Haapalainen, 60, Finnish ice hockey player (SM-liiga).
Bhupen Hazarika, 85, Indian singer.
Sir Gordon Higginson, 81, British educationalist and engineer.
Takeo Nishioka, 75, Japanese politician, Minister of Education (1988–1989) and Speaker of the House of Councillors (since 2010), pneumonia.
Henry D. Owen, 91, American diplomat.
Damaskinos Papandreou, 75, Greek-born Turkish Orthodox hierarch, Metropolitan of Hadrianopolis (since 2003).
Yuvan Shestalov, 74, Russian Mansi language writer.

6
Géza Alföldy, 76, Hungarian historian.
Gordon Beck, 75, British jazz pianist and composer.
Isaac Chocrón, 81, Venezuelan playwright.
Margaret Field, 89, American actress (The Man from Planet X, Captive Women, The Story of Will Rogers), cancer.
Philip Gould, Baron Gould of Brookwood, 61, British advertising executive and political adviser, cancer.
Giacomo Gualco, 75, Italian politician, President of Liguria (1990–1992).
Mel Hancock, 82, American politician, U.S. Representative from Missouri (1989–1997).
Hickstead, 15, Dutch-born Canadian show jumping horse, Olympic champion (2008), ruptured aorta.
Hal Kanter, 92, American screenwriter, director and producer (Julia), complications from pneumonia.
Peretz Kidron, 78, Israeli writer, journalist and translator.
Carl Nyrén, 93, Swedish architect.
Allan Peachey, 62, New Zealand politician, Member of Parliament for Tamaki (2005–2011), cancer.
William David Lindsay Ride, 85, Australian zoologist.
Charles Walton, 89, American electrical engineer, patentee of RFID.

7
James E. Barrett, 89, American federal judge.
Joe Frazier, 67, American boxer, World Heavyweight Champion (1970–1973), liver cancer.
Marie Ljalková, 90, Czech soldier, sniper of the Soviet Union.
Lisbeth Movin, 94, Danish actress.
Georgi Movsesyan, 66, Russian composer, heart attack.
Dov Schwartzman, 90, Russian-born Israeli Haredi rabbi and rosh yeshiva.
Tomás Segovia, 84, Spanish-born Mexican poet, cancer.
F. Springer, 79, Dutch writer.
Takanosato Toshihide, 59, Japanese sumo wrestler.
Andrea True, 68, American adult film star and disco singer, heart failure.

8
Jimmy Adamson, 82, British football player and coach.
Al Boeke, 88, American architect, developer of Sea Ranch, California, and Mililani, Hawai'i.
Hal Bruno, 83, American journalist, political director of ABC News (1980–1999), heart arrhythmia after a fall.
Gene Cantamessa, 80, American sound engineer (E.T. the Extra-Terrestrial, Ghostbusters, Young Frankenstein), Oscar winner (1983).
Oscar Rolando Cantuarias Pastor, 80, Peruvian Roman Catholic prelate, Archbishop of Piura (1981–2006).
Nosson Tzvi Finkel, 68, American-born Israeli Haredi rabbi and rosh yeshiva.
Katherine Grant, 12th Countess of Dysart, 93, Scottish peeress.
Heavy D, 44, Jamaican-born American rapper ("Now That We Found Love") and actor (The Cider House Rules, Life), pulmonary embolism.
Ricky Hui, 65, Hong Kong actor, heart attack.
Sir David Jack, 87, Scottish pharmacologist.
Bil Keane, 89, American cartoonist (The Family Circus), heart failure.
Valentin Ivanov, 76, Russian football player and coach.
Ed Macauley, 83, American basketball player (St. Louis Hawks, Boston Celtics).
Jimmy Norman, 74, American rhythm and blues and jazz musician and songwriter.
Herbert S. Okun, 80, American diplomat.
Floyd Rice, 62, American football player (San Diego Chargers, Oakland Raiders), lung cancer.
Vladimir Shitov, 60, Russian luger.
Lauri Sutela, 93, Finnish military officer, Chief of Defence (1974–1983).
Jan Wypiorczyk, 64, Polish Olympic wrestler.

9
Shmuel Ben-Artzi, 96, Israeli writer, father-in-law of Benjamin Netanyahu.
Bob Carney, 79, American basketball player (Minneapolis Lakers).
Roger Christian, 75, American Olympic gold medal-winning (1960) ice hockey player.
Har Gobind Khorana, 89, Indian-born American biochemist, Nobel laureate (1968), natural causes.
Wilfred G. Lambert, 85, English historian and archaeologist.
Ézio Leal Moraes Filho, 45, Brazilian football player, pancreatic cancer.
Benny McCoy, 96, American baseball player (Detroit Tigers, Philadelphia Athletics).
Sir Robin Mountfield, 72, British civil servant.
Dani Wadada Nabudere, 79, Ugandan academic.
Jean-Paul Randriamanana, 52, Malagasy Roman Catholic prelate, Auxiliary Bishop of Antananarivo (since 1999).
Terry Willers, 76, Irish cartoonist.

10
Peter J. Biondi, 69, American politician, member of the New Jersey General Assembly (since 1998), mesothelioma.
David Boyd, 87, Australian artist.
Manuel Carbonell, 93, Cuban-born American sculptor.
Winston C. Doby, 71, American mathematician.
Ana Grepo, 36, Croatian model, carbon monoxide asphyxiation.
Barbara Grier, 78, American publisher (Naiad Press) and writer, cancer.
Andrei Igorov, 71, Romanian sprint canoer.
Ivan Martin Jirous, 67, Czech poet and dissident.
Alan Keen, 73, British politician, MP for Feltham and Heston (since 1992), cancer.
Killer Karl Kox, 80, American professional wrestler.
Petar Kralj, 70, Serbian actor.
Jacques Lataste, 89, French Olympic fencer.
Hiroshi Saito, 78, Japanese Olympic basketball player.
Andy Tielman, 75, Dutch Indorock musician, gastric cancer.
Adrián Yospe, 41, Argentine actor, cancer.

11
Dennis Alexander, 76, English footballer.
William Aramony, 84, American charity executive.
*Francisco Blake Mora, 45, Mexican politician, Secretary of the Interior (since 2010), helicopter crash.
Domenico Tarcisio Cortese, 80, Italian Roman Catholic prelate, Bishop of Mileto-Nicotera-Tropea (1979–2007).
John Francis Donoghue, 83, American Roman Catholic prelate, Archbishop of Atlanta (1993–2004), after short illness.
Emory Folmar, 81, American politician, Mayor of Montgomery, Alabama (1977–1999), after long illness.
Michael Garrick, 78, English jazz pianist and composer, cerebral hemorrhage.
Fridtjof Frank Gundersen, 77, Norwegian jurist and politician.
Choiseul Henriquez, 51, Haitian politician.
Charlie Lea, 54, French-born American baseball player (Montreal Expos), heart attack.
Hellmut May, 90, Austrian Olympic figure skater.
Bernd Methe, 47, German handball referee, traffic accident.
Reiner Methe, 47, German handball referee, traffic accident.
David Myers, 73, American politician, Oklahoma State Senator (2002–2011), pneumonia.
Pushpa Ratna Sagar, 89, Nepalese grammarian.
Nick Strincevich, 96, American baseball player (Pittsburgh Pirates, Boston Braves).

12
Gavin Bornholdt, 63, New Zealand Olympic sailor (1976).
Doyle Bramhall, 62, American blues musician, heart failure.
Alun Evans, 69, Welsh football administrator, General Secretary of the Football Association of Wales (1982–1995), after long illness.
George Hazle, 87, South African Olympic athlete.
Zbigniew Jaworowski, 84, Polish physicist.
Evelyn Lauder, 75, Austrian-born American philanthropist (The Breast Cancer Research Foundation), creator of pink ribbon symbol, complications from ovarian cancer.
Julius C. Michaelson, 89, American politician, Rhode Island Attorney General (1975–1979) and State Senator (1962–1974).
Eva Monley, 88, German-born Kenyan film location scout (Empire of the Sun, Lawrence of Arabia).
Peter Roebuck, 55, British-Australian cricketer and columnist, suicide by defenestration.
Jim Sullivan, 43, Canadian curler, world junior champion (1988), suicide.
Ilya Zhitomirskiy, 22, Russian-born American Internet entrepreneur, co-founder of Diaspora social network site, apparent suicide.

13
Nigel Abbott, 91, Australian politician, member of the Tasmanian House of Assembly for Denison (1964–1972).
Anders John Aune, 87, Norwegian politician.
Bobsam Elejiko, 30, Nigerian footballer, traumatic aortic rupture.
Guido Falaschi, 22, Argentine racing driver, racing accident.
Patrick Ford, 55, former Commonwealth featherweight boxing champion, heart attack.
Bayazit Gizatullin, 75, Russian Olympic skier.
Masao Nakayama, 70, Micronesian politician and diplomat, complications from a stroke.
Pat Passlof, 83, American painter, cancer.
Esperanza Pérez Labrador, 89, Cuban-born Argentine human rights activist (Mothers of the Plaza de Mayo).
Jamie Pierre, 38, American professional skier, avalanche.
Artemio Lomboy Rillera, 64, Philippine Roman Catholic prelate, Bishop of Bangued (1993–2005) and San Fernando de La Union (since 2005).
Solly Tyibilika, 32, South African rugby player, shot.

14
Esin Afşar, 75, Turkish singer and stage actress, leukemia.
Alan F. Alford, 49-50, British writer and speaker.
Franz Josef Degenhardt, 79, German poet, satirist, novelist and folk singer.
Guy Dejouany, 90, French businessman.
Richard Douthwaite, 69, British economist and ecologist.
Alf Fields, 92, English footballer (Arsenal F.C.).
Maurice Gaidon, 83, French Roman Catholic prelate, Bishop of Cahors (1987–2004).
Neil Heywood, 41, British businessman, poisoned.
Brikt Jensen, 83, Norwegian literary critic and publisher.
Jackie Leven, 61, Scottish musician, lung cancer.
John Lincoln, 95, Australian judge.
Cargill MacMillan Jr., 84, American billionaire businessman.
Peter Naigow, Liberian politician, Vice President of Liberia (1991).
Teresa P. Pica, 66, American academic and educator.
Lee Pockriss, 87, American songwriter ("Itsy Bitsy Teenie Weenie Yellow Polka Dot Bikini").
Jo Ann Sayers, 93, American actress.
Čestmír Vejdělek, 86, Czech writer.

15
William Arveson, 76, American mathematician.
Lev Borisov, 77, Russian actor, stroke.
Oba Chandler, 65, American convicted murderer, executed by lethal injection.
Antonio Eceiza, 76, Spanish film director and screenwriter.
Dulcie Gray, 95, English actress (Howards' Way) and novelist, bronchial pneumonia.
John Hart, 75, English schoolmaster, first man to win Mastermind.
Thomas Worrall Kent, 89, Canadian journalist and public servant, cardiac arrest.
Moogy Klingman, 61, American rock keyboardist (Utopia) and songwriter, cancer.
Ingrid Sandahl, 87, Swedish Olympic gold medal-winning (1952) gymnast.
Karl Slover, 93, Slovak-born American actor (The Wizard of Oz).

16
Ruslan Akhtakhanov, 58, Chechen poet and academic, shot.
Hale Baugh, 87, American Olympic modern pentathlete.
Jacobus Duivenvoorde, 83, Dutch-born Indonesian Roman Catholic prelate, Archbishop of Merauke (1972–2004).
Djamel Keddou, 59, Algerian football player and manager (USM Alger).
Armando Morales, 84, Nicaraguan painter.
René A. Morel, 79, French-born American violin luthier.
James Fraser Mustard, 84, Canadian doctor and early childhood educator, cancer.
Eddy Palchak, 71, Canadian ice hockey trainer and equipment manager.
Maureen Swanson, 78, British actress.

17
John Booth, 61, Australian politician, member of the New South Wales Legislative Assembly (1984–1991).
Olin Branstetter, 82, American politician, Oklahoma State Senator (1987–1991), plane crash.
Kurt Budke, 50, American women's basketball coach (Oklahoma State University), plane crash.
*José de Aquino Pereira, 91, Brazilian Roman Catholic prelate, Bishop of São José do Rio Preto (1968–1997).
Gary Garcia, 63, American musician (Buckner & Garcia).
Enric Garriga i Trullols, 85, Spanish Catalan independentist and defender of Occitan Nation.
Richard Kuh, 90, American lawyer.
*Ng Chiau-tong, 79, Taiwanese activist, chairman of the World United Formosans for Independence (1995–2011), surgical complications.
*Pham Van Loc, 92, Vietnamese Roman Catholic prelate, Bishop of Kontum (1975–1995).
Peter Reading, 65, English poet.
Charles M. Williams, 94, American professor of finance.

18
Mark Blaug, 84, British economist.
Erik Gjems-Onstad, 89, Norwegian politician and resistance member.
Walt Hazzard, 69, American basketball player (Los Angeles Lakers, Atlanta Hawks), complications following heart surgery.
David Langdon, 97, British cartoonist.
Jones Mwewa, 38, Zambian footballer.
Ülo Nugis, 67, Estonian politician and economist.
Paul Ezra Rhoades, 54, American spree killer, execution by lethal injection.
Daniel Sada, 58, Mexican author and poet, kidney disease.

19
Ömer Lütfi Akad, 95, Turkish film director.
David Bolstad, 42, New Zealand champion woodchopper.
Francis Cabot, 86, American gardener and horticulturist.
Gordon S. Clinton, 91, American politician, Mayor of Seattle (1956–1964).
Yvan Covent, 71, Belgian Olympic cyclist.
Basil D'Oliveira, 80, South African-born English cricketer.
Sonny Dixon, 87, American baseball player (Washington Senators, Philadelphia Athletics).
Russell Garcia, 95, American-born New Zealand composer.
Sanford Garelik, 93, American politician, President of the New York City Council (1970–1973).
Ladi Geisler, 83, Czech musician.
Michael Hastings, 73, English playwright.
Ira Michael Heyman, 81, American lawyer and administrator, Secretary of the Smithsonian Institution (1994–2000).
Jack Keeney, 89, American federal prosecutor.
Marti Kheel, 63, American ecofeminist.
Pete Leichnitz, 85, Canadian ice hockey player.
Bjarne Lingås, 78, Norwegian Olympic boxer.
John Neville, 86, British-born Canadian actor (The Adventures of Baron Munchausen, The X-Files, Little Women), Alzheimer's disease.
Ronald E. Poelman, 83, American religious leader, head of The Church of Jesus Christ of Latter-day Saints, age-related causes.
Vitaly Shlykov, 77, Russian spymaster, deputy minister of defence.
Peter Steinwender, 83, Austrian Olympian
Ruth Stone, 96, American poet.
Roy West, 70, Australian football player, lung cancer.

20
Noel Baker, 77, Australian football player.
Linda Bebko-Jones, 65, American politician, member of the Pennsylvania House of Representatives (1993–2006).
Fabio Betancur Tirado, 73, Colombian Roman Catholic prelate, Archbishop of Manizales (1996–2010).
Lasse Brandeby, 66, Swedish journalist, actor and television personality.
Frank Leonard Brooks, 100, Canadian artist.
David Cargill, 75, Scottish footballer.
Shelagh Delaney, 72, English playwright (A Taste of Honey) and screenwriter (Dance with a Stranger), breast cancer and heart failure.
Theodore J. Forstmann, 71, American financier (IMG, Topps, Gulfstream) and philanthropist, brain cancer.
Alex Ibru, 66, Nigerian newspaper publisher and politician, Minister of Internal Affairs (1993–1995).
Lenny Lyles, 75, American football player (Baltimore Colts).
Malcolm Mackintosh, 89, British intelligence analyst.
Mario Martiradonna, 73, Italian footballer.
David Messas, 77, French rabbi.
Viktor Modzolevsky, 68, Russian Olympic silver (1968) and bronze-medal winning (1972) fencer, road accident.
Larry Munson, 89, American play-by-play radio announcer (Georgia Bulldogs), pneumonia.
Javier Pradera, 77, Spanish anti-Franco activist, publisher, political analyst and journalist, founder of El País.
Karl Aage Præst, 89, Danish football player.
Talaat Sadat, 57, Egyptian politician.
Itzhak Schneor, 85, Israeli football player and manager.
Barry Steers, 84, Canadian diplomat, Ambassador to Brazil (1971–1976), Japan (1981–1989), High Commissioner to Bermuda (1976–1979).

21
Benjamin Abramowitz, 94, American painter, printmaker, and sculptor.
Dave Adams, 91, Canadian football player.
Syd Cain, 93, British production designer (From Russia with Love, Lolita, Frenzy).
Albert D. Cohen, 97, Canadian businessman.
Herb Capozzi, 86, Canadian businessman, sport team owner and provincial politician, tongue cancer.
Arie van Deursen, 80, Dutch historian.
Theodore Enslin, 86, American poet.
George Gallup, Jr., 81, American pollster, liver cancer.
Greg Halman, 24, Dutch baseball player (Seattle Mariners), stabbed.
Brian Haynes, 60, British Olympic sprint canoer. (death announced on this date)
Eli Hurvitz, 79, Israeli industrialist.
John Jukes, 88, English Roman Catholic prelate, Auxiliary Bishop of Southwark (1979–1998).
Jim Lewis, 84, English Olympic footballer.
Anne McCaffrey, 85, American fantasy writer (Dragonriders of Pern series), stroke.
Hal Patterson, 79, American player of Canadian football (Montreal Alouettes, Hamilton Tiger-Cats).

22
Svetlana Alliluyeva, 85, Soviet-born American defector and author, daughter of Joseph Stalin, colon cancer.
Stan Case, 59, American radio anchor (CNN Radio), road accident.
Pío Corcuera, 90, Argentinian football player.
Princess Elisabeth, Duchess of Hohenberg, 88, Luxembourgian princess.
Ray Flockton, 81, Australian cricketer.
Miguel González Avelar, 74, Mexican politician, Secretary of Public Education (1985–1988), heart and renal failure.
Robert E. Holthus, 77, American racehorse trainer, heart attack.
Carlos Jonguitud Barrios, 87, Mexican union leader and politician, Governor of San Luis Potosí (1979–1985).
Sena Jurinac, 90, Bosnian-born Austrian opera singer.
Georg Kreisler, 89, Austrian-born American cabarettist, satirist, composer and author.
Bud Lewis, 103, American golfer, oldest living member of the Professional Golfers' Association of America, natural causes.
Lynn Margulis, 73, American biologist and evolution theorist, stroke.
Danielle Mitterrand, 87, French activist, widow of François Mitterrand, First Lady of the French Republic (1981–1995).
Dorothy Morris, 89, American actress.
Paul Motian, 80, American jazz drummer, myelodysplastic syndrome.
Frank Pyke, 69, Australian footballer, sports scientist, academic and sports administrator.
Hans Reichel, 62, German guitarist, inventor of the daxophone.
Alberto Reynoso, 71, Filipino Olympic basketball player (1968).
Oskar Schäfer, 90, German Waffen-SS member.
Kristian Schultze, 66, German musician.
Bison Smith, 38, American professional wrestler, heart complications.
Himie Voxman, 99, American musician.

23
Sir Peter Buchanan, 86, British vice admiral and naval secretary.
Charles de Wolff, 79, Dutch organist and composer.
Montserrat Figueras, 69, Spanish soprano.
Oscar Griffin, Jr., 78, American journalist, winner of the 1963 Pulitzer Prize.
Ralph E. Haines, Jr., 98, American general, Vice Chief of Staff of the United States Army (1967–1968).
Huang Weilu, 94, Chinese engineer, chief designer of JL-1.
Luis Fernando Jaramillo Correa, 76, Colombian politician, Minister of Foreign Affairs (1990–1991).
Gerald Laing, 75, British pop artist and sculptor.
Marion Montgomery, 86, American poet.
Carlos Moorhead, 89, American politician, U.S. Representative from California (1973–1997), Alzheimer's disease.
Henry Øberg, 80, Norwegian football referee.
Jim Rathmann, 83, American racing driver, winner of the 1960 Indianapolis 500.
Joseph Sewall, 89, American politician, President of the Maine Senate (1975–1982).
Obrad Stanojević, 77, Serbian law professor.
Rafiq Tağı, 61, Azerbaijani journalist, stabbed.

24
*Antonio Domingo Bussi, 85, Argentine general and politician, Governor of Tucumán Province, heart failure.
Bill Carow, 87, American Olympic speed skater.
Helen Forrester, 92, British-born Canadian writer.
Ludwig Hirsch, 65, Austrian singer and actor, suicide by self-defenestration.
Rauf Khalid, 53, Pakistani actor, writer, director and producer, road accident.
Kishenji, 53, Indian Maoist guerrilla leader, shot.
Imants Kokars, 90, Latvian conductor.
Ross McManus, 84, English musician, father of Elvis Costello.
Humberto Medina, 69, Mexican Olympic footballer (1968).
Salvatore Montagna, 40, Canadian mobster, shot.
Jeno Paulucci, 93, American businessman (Michelina's), pioneer of ready-made ethnic foods.
Anuruddha Ratwatte, 73, Sri Lankan politician and cabinet minister.
David Seely, 4th Baron Mottistone, 91, British aristocrat, Lord Lieutenant of the Isle of Wight (1986–1995).
Tatyana Shchelkanova, 74, Russian Olympic bronze medal-winning (1964) track and field athlete.
Johnny Williams, 76, English footballer (Plymouth Argyle).

25
Vasily Alekseyev, 69, Russian Olympic gold-medal winning weightlifter (1972 and 1976), heart failure.
Milla Baldo-Ceolin, 87, Italian physicist.
John Blades, 51, Australian experimental music artist.
Leonid Borodin, 73, Russian novelist, journalist and Soviet dissident.
Hugh Burnett, 87, English television producer and cartoonist.
Don DeVito, 72, American record company executive and producer.
Mihailo Đurić, 86, Serbian philosopher.
John Edzerza, 63, Canadian politician, Yukon MLA for McIntyre-Takhini (since 2002), leukemia.
Fred Etcher, 79, Canadian Olympic silver medal-winning (1960) ice hockey player.
Karel Hubáček, 87, Czech architect, designer of the Ještěd Tower.
Erling Lægreid, 72, Norwegian author and journalist.
Judy Lewis, 76, American actress (General Hospital, The Secret Storm), daughter of Clark Gable and Loretta Young, cancer.
Hoddy Mahon, 79, American college basketball coach (Seton Hall University).
Frederik Meijer, 91, American businessman, Chairman of Meijer (1964–1990), stroke.
Yukio Nishimoto, 91, Japanese baseball player and manager, heart failure.
Coco Robicheaux, 64, American blues musician and artist.
Dane Searls, 23, Australian BMX rider, diving accident.
Jean Casselman Wadds, 91, Canadian politician, MP for Grenville—Dundas (1958–1968); High Commissioner to the United Kingdom (1979–1983).
Tom Wicker, 85, American journalist, heart attack.
Lee "Shot" Williams, 73, American blues singer.

26
Judit Bognár, 72, Hungarian Olympic athlete.
Manon Cleary, 69, American realist painter, chronic obstructive pulmonary disease.
István Gajda, 30, Hungarian football player, road accident.
Ed Harrington, 70, American-born Canadian football player (Toronto Argonauts), cancer.
Keef Hartley, 67, British musician, complications from surgery.
Rashid Karim, 86, Bangladeshi novelist.
Roland Lacombe, 73, French Olympic cyclist (1960).
Ron Lyle, 70, American boxer, U.S. Amateur Heavyweight Champion (1970), complications from stomach ailment.
Ludwig Meister, 91, German Luftwaffe flying ace.
Iván Menczel, 69, Hungarian Olympic gold-medal winning (1968) footballer.
Patrick Mollison, 97, British haematologist.
C. Odumegwu Ojukwu, 78, Nigerian politician, Biafra rebel leader and President of Biafra (1967–1970), stroke.
Tsewang Yishey Pemba, 79, Tibetan physician.
Mak Schoorl, 98, Dutch Olympic rower (1936).
Martin Schroyens, 81, Belgian footballer
Arthur Schultz, 78, American politician, Mayor of Joliet, Illinois (1991–2011), heart failure.

27
Donald Crowdis, 97, Canadian museum curator and broadcaster.
Len Fulford, 83, British photographer and television commercial director (Go to work on an egg, Guinness).
Sultan Khan, 71, Indian musician, recipient of the 2010 Padma Bhushan, kidney failure.
Nolan Luhn, 90, American football player.
April Phumo, 74, South African football coach, cancer.
Vladimir Prikhodko, 67, French Olympic athlete.
Ken Russell, 84, British film director (Women in Love, Tommy), stroke.
Gary Speed, 42, Welsh football player and manager, suicide by hanging.
Judd Woldin, 86, American Tony Award-winning composer (Raisin), cancer.

28
Aruwa Ameh, 20, Nigerian footballer (Bayelsa United).
Vittorio De Seta, 88, Italian film director and screenwriter.
Jon Driver, 49, British psychologist and neuroscientist.
Jaime González, 78, Spanish Olympic sports shooter (1968, 1972, 1976, 1980).
Charles Hoeflich, 97, American businessman.
Thomas J. Kirwan, 78, American politician, member of the New York State Assembly (1995–2008; 2011), kidney failure.
Paweł Komorowski, 81, Polish film director.
Charles T. Kowal, 71, American astronomer.
Lucio Magri, 79, Italian journalist and politician, assisted suicide.
Ante Marković, 87, Croatian politician, Prime Minister of the Socialist Federal Republic of Yugoslavia (1989–1991).
Lloyd J. Old, 78, American immunologist and cancer researcher, prostate cancer.
Zhu Zhaoxiang, 90, Chinese engineer.

29
James Atherton, 83, American photographer, cardiovascular disease.
Roberto Casuso, 57, Cuban Olympic handball player.
Annetto Depasquale, 73, Maltese Roman Catholic prelate, Titular Bishop of Aradi, Auxiliary Bishop of Malta (since 1998).
Donatus Djagom, 92, Indonesian Roman Catholic prelate, Archbishop of Ende (1968–1996).
Guillermo O'Donnell, 75, Argentine political scientist, cancer.
Patrice O'Neal, 41, American comedian, radio personality, and actor (Web Junk 20, Opie and Anthony), complications from stroke.
Mamoni Raisom Goswami, 69, Indian writer and academic, multiple organ failure.

30
Jules Ancion, 87, Dutch Olympic silver medal-winning (1952) field hockey player.
Viktor Apostolov, 49, Bulgarian Olympic hammer thrower (1988).
J. Blackfoot, 65, American soul singer, cancer.
Nelly Byl, 92, Belgian songwriter.
Ana Daniel, 83, Portuguese poet.
Vic Finkelstein, 73, South African disabled rights activist.
Gerd Hagman, 92, Swedish actress.
Charles Ingabire, Rwandan journalist, shot.
Leka, Crown Prince of Albania, 72, Albanian royal and politician, pretender to the Albanian throne (since 1961).
Peter Lunn, 97, British Olympic alpine skier (1936) and spymaster.
Kuldeep Manak, 62, Indian Punjabi language singer, pneumonia.
George McCarty, 96, American college basketball coach (New Mexico State University, UTEP).
Chester McGlockton, 42, American football player (Oakland Raiders, Kansas City Chiefs, Denver Broncos), apparent heart attack.
Zdeněk Miler, 90, Czech animator and illustrator, creator of The Mole.
Robert Osserman, 84, American mathematician.
Carl Robie, 66, American Olympic gold (1968) and silver-medal winning (1964) swimmer.
Partap Sharma, 71, Indian playwright.
Benyamin Sönmez, 28, German-born Turkish cellist.
Bill Waller, 85, American politician, Governor of Mississippi (1972–1976), heart failure.

References 

2011-11
 11